Camões is a crater on Mercury. It has a diameter of 70 kilometers. Its name was adopted by the International Astronomical Union (IAU) in 1976. Camoes is named for the Portuguese poet Luís de Camões, who lived from  1524 to 1580.

To the northwest of Camões is the crater Ōkyo.  To the northeast is Spitteler.

References

Impact craters on Mercury